The Rwanda national under-17 football team represents Rwanda in association football at the under-17 age level and is controlled by the Fédération Rwandaise de Football Association. The team competes in the Africa U-17 Cup of Nations and the FIFA U-17 World Cup, which are both held every two years.

Rwanda participated in the FIFA U-17 World Cup for the first time in 2011, having finished second in the 2011 African U-17 Championship on home soil. However, they were eliminated in the group stage after suffering defeats against England and Uruguay, and playing to a draw against Canada.

The team is currently coached by Richard Tardy of France, who previously managed Superleague Greece club Aris Thessaloniki and the Lebanon national football team.

Competitive records

FIFA U-17 World Cup competitive record

|-
|  1985
| rowspan="8" colspan="8" | Did Not Enter
|-
|  1987
|-
|  1989
|-
|  1991
|-
|  1993
|-
|  1995
|-
|  1997
|-
|  1999
|-
|  2001
| rowspan="1" colspan="8" | Did Not Qualify
|-
|  2003
| rowspan="1" colspan="8" | Did Not Enter
|-
|  2005
| rowspan="3" colspan="8" | Did Not Qualify
|-
|  2007
|-
|  2009

|-
|  2013
| rowspan="2" colspan="8" | Did Not Qualify
|-
|  2015
|-
|  2017
| rowspan="1" colspan="8" | Did Not Enter
|-
| 2019
| rowspan="1" colspan="8" | Did Not Qualify
|-
| 2021
| rowspan="1" colspan="8" | To be determined
|-

African U-17 Championship competitive record

|-
|  1995
| rowspan="3" colspan="8" | Did Not Enter
|-
|  1997
|-
|  1999
|-
|  2001
| rowspan="1" colspan="8" | Did Not Qualify
|-
|  2003
| rowspan="1" colspan="8" | Did Not Enter
|-
|  2005
| rowspan="3" colspan="8" | Did Not Qualify
|-
|  2007
|-
|  2009

|-
|  2013
| rowspan="2" colspan="8" | Did Not Qualify
|-
|  2015
|-
|  2017
| rowspan="1" colspan="8" | Did Not Enter
|-
|  2019
| rowspan="1" colspan="8" | Did Not Qualify

Players
The following players were named in the squad for the 2011 FIFA U-17 World Cup. Clubs correct as of 18 June 2011.

See also
 Rwanda national football team
 Rwanda national under-20 football team

U
African national under-17 association football teams